Metathrinca rosaria is a moth in the family Xyloryctidae. It was described by Edward Meyrick in 1907. It is found in Bhutan.

The wingspan is 23–24 mm. The forewings are shining snow white with a submarginal series of seven black dots around the apex and termen. The hindwings are white.

References

Metathrinca
Moths described in 1907